Galazio Kai Lefko (Greek: Γαλάζιο Και Λευκό; English: Blue And White) is the third EP by Greek artist, Katy Garbi. It was released on 22 July 2004 by Sony Music Greece and received gold certification, selling over 10,000 units*. The title track was released to coincide with the 2004 Athens Olympics with its title name reflecting the national colours, blue and white.

In 2004, gold was the EP whose sales exceeded 10,000 units.

Track listing

Singles 
The following singles were officially released to radio stations, gaining considerable airplay. "Katapliktiko" was the only single with a music video.

 "Katapliktiko" (Amazing)
 "Galazio Kai Lefko" (Blue And White)
 "Esena Mono (Summer Dance Remix)" (Only You)

Credits 
Credits adapted from liner notes.

Personnel 

 Dimitris Antoniou – guitars (tracks: 3, 4)
 Stelios Goulielmos – backing vocals (tracks: 1, 2)
 Anna Ioannidou – backing vocals (tracks: 1, 2)
 Katerina Kiriakou – backing vocals (tracks: 1)
 Alex Panagi – backing vocals (tracks: 1)
 Lazaros Palaskas – keyboards (tracks: 2)
 Ilias Pantazopoulos – orchestration, programming (tracks: 2)
 Panagiotis Stergiou – cura, lute (tracks: 3, 4)
 Nikos Terzis – orchestration, programming, keyboards (tracks: 1, 3, 4, 5)

Production 

 Ntinos Diamantopoulos – photographer
 Giannis Doulamis – production manager
 Giannis Ioannidis (Digital Press Hellas) – mastering
 Lefteris Neromiliotis (Sofita studio) – sound engineer, mix engineer
 Dimitris Rekouniotis – art direction
 Petros Siakavellas (Digital Press Hellas) – mastering

Charts 
Galazio Kai Lefko made its debut at number 2 on the 'Greece Top 50 Singles' charts.

After 23 weeks on the charts, it was certified gold by IFPI.

References 

Katy Garbi EPs
Katy Garbi remix albums
2004 EPs
Greek-language albums